The 1928 All-Eastern football team consists of American football players chosen by various selectors as the best players at each position among the Eastern colleges and universities during the 1928 college football season.

All-Eastern selections

Quarterbacks
 Howard Harpster, Carnegie Tech (AP-1)

Halfbacks
 Chris Cagle, Army (AP-1)
 Ken Strong, NYU (AP-1)

Fullbacks
 Paul Scull, Penn (AP-1)

Ends
 Theodore Rosenzweig, Carnegie Tech (AP-1)
 Edward Messinger, Army (AP-1)

Tackles
 Bud Sprague, Army (AP-1)
 Afred "Al" Lassman, NYU (AP-1)

Guards
 Edward Burke, Navy (AP-1)
 Bruce Dumont, Colgate (AP-1)

Centers
 Charles Howe, Princeton (AP-1)

Key
 AP = Associated Press

See also
 1928 College Football All-America Team

References

All-Eastern
All-Eastern college football teams